The cornicle (or siphuncule) is one of a pair of small upright backward-pointing tubes found on the dorsal side of the 5th or 6th abdominal segments of aphids. They are sometimes mistaken for cerci. They are no more than pores in some species.

These abdominal tubes exude droplets of a quick-hardening defensive fluid containing triacylglycerols called cornicle wax. 
There is some confusion in the literature about the function of the cornicle wax secretions. It was common at one time to suggest that the cornicles were the source of the honeydew, and this was even included in the Shorter Oxford English Dictionary
and the 2008 edition of the World Book Encyclopedia. There also is documentation in the literature for cornicle wax luring predators in some cases.

References

Aphids
Insect anatomy